Ignacio Macaya Santos de Lamadrid (2 December 1933 in Barcelona – 5 September 2006 in Barcelona) was a Spanish field hockey player who competed in the 1960 Summer Olympics and in the 1964 Summer Olympics. His cousins Joaquín Dualde and Eduardo Dualde were also international hockey players.

References

External links
 

1933 births
2006 deaths
Spanish male field hockey players
Olympic field hockey players of Spain
Field hockey players at the 1960 Summer Olympics
Field hockey players at the 1964 Summer Olympics
Olympic bronze medalists for Spain
Olympic medalists in field hockey
Field hockey players from Barcelona
Medalists at the 1960 Summer Olympics
20th-century Spanish people